Claudio Abbado  (26 June 1933 – 20 January 2014) was an Italian conductor who was one of the leading conductors of his generation. He served as music director of the La Scala opera house in Milan, principal conductor of the London Symphony Orchestra, principal guest conductor of the Chicago Symphony Orchestra, music director of the Vienna State Opera, founder and director of Lucerne Festival Orchestra, founder and director of Mahler Chamber Orchestra, founding Artistic Director of Orchestra Mozart, music director of European Union Youth Orchestra, and principal conductor of the Berlin Philharmonic orchestra.

Biography

Early life and background
The Abbado family for several generations enjoyed both wealth and respect in their community. Abbado's great-grandfather tarnished the family reputation by gambling away the family fortune. His son, Abbado's grandfather, became a professor at the University of Turin. His grandfather re-established the family's reputation and also showed talent as an amateur musician.

Born in Milan, Italy on 26 June 1933, Claudio Abbado was the son of violinist Michelangelo Abbado, and the brother of the musician Marcello Abbado (born 1926). His father, a professional violinist and a professor at the Giuseppe Verdi Conservatory, was his first piano teacher. His mother, Maria Carmela Savagnone, also was an adept pianist. Marcello Abbado later became a concert pianist, composer, and teacher at the Rossini Conservatory in Pesaro. His sister also exhibited talent in music, but did not pursue a musical career after her marriage. His other brother later became a successful architect.

Abbado's childhood encompassed the Nazi occupation of Milan. During that time, Abbado's mother spent time in prison for harbouring a Jewish child. This period solidified his anti-fascist political sentiments. Claudio himself is known for having a famous anecdote about how when he was just eleven years old he wrote "Viva Bartók" on a local wall which caught the attention of the Gestapo and sent them on the hunt for the culprit. His passionate opposition to fascism continued into his adult years. However, his musical interests also developed, with attendance at performances at La Scala, as well as orchestral rehearsals in Milan led by such conductors as Arturo Toscanini and Wilhelm Furtwängler. He later recalled how he hated seeing Toscanini in rehearsal.

Other conductors who influenced him were Bruno Walter, Josef Krips and Herbert von Karajan. It was not until hearing Antonio Guarnieri's conducting of Claude Debussy's Nocturnes that Abbado resolved to become a conductor himself. At age 15, Abbado first met Leonard Bernstein when Bernstein was conducting a performance featuring Abbado's father as a soloist. Bernstein commented, "You have the eye to be a conductor."

Education and early engagements

Abbado studied piano, composition, and conducting at the Milan Conservatory, and graduated with a degree in piano in 1955. The following year, he studied conducting with Hans Swarowsky at the Vienna Academy of Music, on the recommendation of Zubin Mehta. Abbado and Mehta both joined the Academy chorus to be able to watch such conductors as Bruno Walter and Herbert von Karajan in rehearsal. He also spent time at the Chigiana Academy in Siena.

In 1958, Abbado made his conducting debut in Trieste. That summer, he won the international Serge Koussevitzky Competition for conductors at the Tanglewood Music Festival, which resulted in a number of operatic conducting engagements in Italy. In 1959, he conducted his first opera, The Love for Three Oranges, in Trieste. He made his La Scala conducting debut in 1960. In 1963, he won the Dimitri Mitropoulos Prize for conductors, which allowed him to work for five months with the New York Philharmonic as an assistant conductor to Bernstein. Abbado made his New York Philharmonic professional conducting debut on 7 April 1963. A 1965 appearance at the RIAS Festival in Berlin led to an invitation from Herbert von Karajan to the Salzburg Festival the following year to work with the Vienna Philharmonic. In 1965, Abbado made his British debut with the Hallé Orchestra, followed in 1966 by his London Symphony Orchestra (LSO) debut.

Abbado taught chamber music for 3 years during the early 1960s in Parma.

Conducting career
In 1969, Abbado became principal conductor at La Scala. Subsequently, he became the company's music director in 1972. He took the title of joint artistic director, along with Giorgio Strehler and Carlo Maria Badini, in 1976. During his tenure, he extended the opera season to four months, and focused on giving inexpensive performances for the working class and students. In addition to the standard opera repertoire, he presented contemporary operas, including works of Luigi Dallapiccola and of Luigi Nono, in particular the world premiere of Nono's Al gran sole carico d'amore. In 1976, he brought the La Scala company to the US for its American debut in Washington, D.C. for the American Bicentennial. In 1982, he founded the Filarmonica della Scala for the performance of orchestral repertoire by the house orchestra in concert. Abbado remained affiliated with La Scala until 1986.

On 7 October 1968, Abbado made his debut with the Metropolitan Opera with Don Carlo. He began to work more extensively with the Vienna Philharmonic (VPO) after 1971, which included two engagements as conductor of the orchestra's New Year's Day concert, in 1988 and 1991. He was a recipient of both the Philharmonic Ring and the Golden Nicolai Medal from the Vienna Philharmonic.

He served as Principal Guest Conductor of the London Symphony Orchestra (LSO) from 1975 to 1979 and became its Principal Conductor in 1979, a post he held until 1987. (He was also the LSO's Music Director from 1984 until the end of his principal conductor tenure.) From 1982 to 1985, he was principal guest conductor of the Chicago Symphony Orchestra (CSO). In 1986, Abbado became the Generalmusikdirector (GMD) of the city of Vienna, and in parallel, was music director of the Vienna State Opera from 1986 to 1991. During his tenure as GMD in Vienna, in 1988, he founded the music festival Wien Modern. There he backed numerous contemporary composers including György Ligeti, Pierre Boulez, and Luigi Nono.

Berlin Philharmonic
Abbado first conducted the Berlin Philharmonic in December 1966. In the late 1980s it was suspected that he might become music director of the New York Philharmonic. However, after appearances as a guest conductor, in 1989, the Berlin Philharmonic elected him as its chief conductor and artistic director, in succession to Herbert von Karajan. During his Berlin tenure, he oversaw an increased presence of contemporary music in the orchestra's programming. In 1992, he co-founded 'Berlin Encounters', a chamber music festival. In 1994, he became artistic director of the Salzburg Easter Festival. In 1998, he announced his departure from the Berlin Philharmonic after the expiration of his contract in 2002. Prior to his departure, he was diagnosed with stomach cancer in 2000, which led to his cancellation of a number of engagements with the orchestra. Subsequent medical treatment led to the removal of a portion of his digestive system, and he cancelled his conducting activities for 3 months in 2001.

In 2004, Abbado returned to conduct the Berlin Philharmonic for the first time since his departure as chief conductor, for concerts of Mahler's Symphony No. 6 recorded live for commercial release. The resulting CD won Best Orchestral Recording and Record of the Year in Gramophone magazine's 2006 awards. The Orchestra Academy of the Berlin Philharmonic established the Claudio Abbado Kompositionspreis (Claudio Abbado Composition Prize) in his honour, which has since been awarded in 2006, 2010 and 2014.

Other orchestras and post-Berlin work
In addition to his work with long-established ensembles, Abbado founded a number of new orchestras with younger musicians at their core. These included the European Community Youth Orchestra (later the European Union Youth Orchestra (EUYO)), in 1978, and the Gustav Mahler Jugendorchester (GMJO; Gustav Mahler Youth Orchestra) in (1988). In both instances, musicians from the respective youth orchestras founded spinoff orchestras, the Chamber Orchestra of Europe (COE) and the Mahler Chamber Orchestra, respectively. Abbado worked with both these ensembles regularly as well, and was artistic advisor to the COE, though he did not hold a formal title with the Mahler Chamber Orchestra. In turn, the Mahler Chamber Orchestra formed the core of the newest incarnation of the Lucerne Festival Orchestra, which Abbado and Michael Haefliger of the Lucerne Festival established in the early 2000s, and which featured musicians from various orchestras with which Abbado had long-standing artistic relationships. From 2004 until his death, Abbado was the musical and artistic director of the Orchestra Mozart, Bologna, Italy. In addition to his work with the EUYO and the GMJO, Abbado worked with the Orquesta Sinfónica Simón Bolívar of Venezuela.

Death
Abbado died from stomach cancer in Bologna on 20 January 2014 at the age of 80. One week later, in tribute to him, the orchestra "Filarmonica della Scala", conducted by Daniel Barenboim, performed the slow movement of Beethoven's Symphony No. 3 (Marcia funebre: Adagio assai in C minor) to an empty theater, with the performance relayed to a crowd in the square in front of the opera house and live-streamed via La Scala's website. He is buried in Val Fex in Switzerland. His musical estate was transferred to the Berlin State Library where it is being catalogued and digitised.

Personal life
From his first marriage in 1956, to singer Giovanna Cavazzoni, Abbado had two children: Daniele Abbado (born 1958), who became an opera director and Alessandra (born 1959). His first marriage was dissolved. From his second marriage, to Gabriella Cantalupi, Abbado had a son, Sebastiano. His four-year relationship with Viktoria Mullova resulted in Mullova's first child, a son, the jazz bassist, Misha Mullov-Abbado. Abbado's nephew, the son of his brother, Marcello, is the conductor Roberto Abbado.

Conducting

Repertoire
Amongst a wide range of Romantic works which he recorded and performed, Abbado had a particular affinity with the music of Gustav Mahler, whose symphonies he recorded several times. Despite this, he never managed to complete a cycle with a single orchestra: in a mix of studio and concert releases, he recorded Symphonies 1–2 and 5–7 in Chicago, Symphonies 2–4, 9 and the Adagio from 10 in Vienna, Symphonies 1 and 3–9 in Berlin, and Symphonies 1–7 and 9 in Lucerne. A planned Eighth in Lucerne (the intended culmination of his traversal of the symphonies there) had to be cancelled owing to his ill health. The symphony was finally performed and recorded in 2016 under Riccardo Chailly as a tribute to Abbado. A further Tenth Adagio recorded live in Berlin in 2011 was issued as part of a Berliner Philharmoniker Mahler set in 2020. 

He was also noted for his interpretations of modern works by composers such as Arnold Schoenberg, Karlheinz Stockhausen, Giacomo Manzoni, Luigi Nono, Bruno Maderna, György Ligeti, Giovanni Sollima, Roberto Carnevale, Franco Donatoni and George Benjamin.

Musical style
Abbado tended to speak very little in rehearsal, sometimes using the simple request to orchestras to "Listen". This was a reflection of his own preference for communication as a conductor via physical gesture and the eyes, and his perception that orchestras did not like conductors who spoke a great deal in rehearsal. Clive Gillinson characterised Abbado's style as follows:

"...he basically doesn't say anything in rehearsals, and speaks so quietly, because he's so shy, so people can get bored. But it works because everyone knows the performances are so great. I've never known anybody more compelling. He's the most natural conductor in the world. Some conductors need to verbally articulate what they want through words, but Claudio just shows it, just does it."

In performance, Abbado often conducted from memory, as he himself noted:

"...it is indispensable to know the score perfectly and be familiar with the life, the works and the entire era of the composer. I feel more secure without a score. Communication with the orchestra is easier."

Recordings
Abbado recorded extensively for a variety of labels, including Decca, Deutsche Grammophon, Columbia (later Sony Classical), and EMI. He conducted many opera recordings which received various awards. Among these were the Diapason Award in 1966 and 1967; also in 1967 he received the Grand Prix du Disque. In 1968 he was presented with the Deutscher Schallplattenpreis and also the Dutch Edison Award. In 1973, the Vienna Mozart Society awarded him the Mozart Medal. Abbado received the 1997 Grammy Award in the Best Small Ensemble Performance (with or without conductor) category for "Hindemith: Kammermusik No. 1 With Finale 1921, Op. 24 No. 1" and the 2005 Grammy Award in the Best Instrumental Soloist(s) Performance (with Orchestra) category for "Beethoven: Piano Concertos Nos. 2 & 3" performed by Martha Argerich.

In 2012, Abbado was voted into the Gramophone Hall of Fame that April, and in May, he received the conductor prize at the Royal Philharmonic Society Music Awards.

Honours and awards

 Koussevitzky Prize, 1958
 Dimitri Mitropoulos Memorial International Competition, 1963 (Won the one-year position as assistant conductor to Leonard Bernstein at the New York Philharmonic.)
 Knight Grand Cross of the Order of Merit of the Italian Republic, 12 July 1984
 Mahler Medal, 1985
 Grand cross of the Légion d'honneur, 1986
 City of Vienna, Ehrenring [Honor ring], 1994
 Ernst von Siemens Music Prize, 1994
 Medal for Meritorious for Culture and Art, 13 January 1997
 Knight Commander of the Order of Merit of the Federal Republic of Germany, 2002 
 Praemium Imperiale, 2003
 Royal Philharmonic Society Gold Medal, 2003
 Wolff Prize in Arts, 2008

Abbado received honorary doctorates from the universities of Ferrara (1990), Cambridge (1994), Aberdeen (1986) and Havana.

On 30 August 2013, Giorgio Napolitano, President of Italy, appointed Abbado to the Italian Senate as a Senator for life, in honour of his "outstanding cultural achievements". Abbado became a member of the Public Education and Cultural Heritage Commission of the Italian Senate on 25 September 2013.

Videography
 New Year's Eve Concert 1992: Richard Strauss Gala with Martha Argerich, Kathleen Battle, Renée Fleming, Andreas Schmidt, Frederica von Stade and the Berlin Philharmonic Orchestra, Kultur Video DVD, D4209, 2007
 Hearing the Silence (Documentary), Berliner Philharmoniker, Lucerne Festival Orchestra.
 "Beethoven, Symphonies 3 & 9, Berliner Philharmoniker." Euroarts, 2 DVD set. Symphony No. 3 performed by the Accademia Nazionale di Santa Cecelia, Rome, February, 2001. Symphony No. 9 performed by the Berliner Philharmoniker, May, 2000 / August, 2002, in Munich. The DVD of Symphony NO. 3 offers "Conductor Camera" sequences, in which the orchestra's view of the conductor may be selected. Symphony 9 performers include Karita Mattila, soprano; Violetta Urmana, mezzo-soprano; Thomas Moser, tenor; Eike Wilm Schulte, baritone; the Swedish Radio Choir and the Eric Ericson Chamber Choir; Chorus Master, Tönu Kaljuste.

References

Sources

External links 

 
 Claudio Abbado at Deutsche Grammophon
 Claudio Abbado at Sony BMG Masterworks
 Claudio Abbado discography
 
 Berlin Philharmonic Orchestra, 'Maestro With Cult Status', page on Claudio Abbado
  Gramophone artist page on Claudio Abbado
 Presidenza della Repubblica, Italian-language page on Claudio Abbado and state honours from Italy
 Elisabetta Povoledo, "Thousands Pay Tribute to Abbado in Front of La Scala". New York Times, "ArtsBeat" blog, 27 January 2014
 London Symphony Orchestra tribute page to Claudio Abbado
 Interview with Claudio Abbado, 3 February 1985

People of Piedmontese descent
Italian conductors (music)
Italian male conductors (music)
20th-century Italian conductors (music)
21st-century Italian conductors (music)
21st-century Italian male musicians
Music directors (opera)
Music directors of the Vienna State Opera
London Symphony Orchestra principal conductors
Royal Philharmonic Society Gold Medallists
Sony Classical Records artists
Deutsche Grammophon artists
EMI Classics and Virgin Classics artists
Grammy Award winners
Knights Grand Cross of the Order of Merit of the Italian Republic
Knights Commander of the Order of Merit of the Federal Republic of Germany
Grand Croix of the Légion d'honneur
Honorary Members of the Royal Academy of Music
Wolf Prize in Arts laureates
University of Music and Performing Arts Vienna alumni
Accademia Musicale Chigiana alumni
Milan Conservatory alumni
Italian expatriates in Austria
Italian expatriates in the United Kingdom
Italian expatriates in Germany
Italian life senators
Musicians from Milan
1933 births
2014 deaths
Deaths from cancer in Emilia-Romagna
Deaths from stomach cancer
Ernst von Siemens Music Prize winners
Recipients of the Praemium Imperiale
20th-century Italian male musicians